Shahbulaq, Şahbulaq

 Shahbulaq or Şahbulaq - settlement in Nakhchivan formerly known as Cağazur
 Shah Bulaq - alternate name for Shirin Bolagh village in the Ardabil region of Iran
 Shahbulag Castle - fortress near Agham in Azerbaijan